Jacques Musson is a retired French slalom canoeist.

Career
Musson competed from the late 1940s to the early 1950s. He won two medals at the 1951 ICF Canoe Slalom World Championships in Steyr with a gold in the C-2 team event and a silver in the C-2 event.

References

French male canoeists
Living people
Year of birth missing (living people)
Medalists at the ICF Canoe Slalom World Championships